Ana Paula de Tassis (born 5 November 1965) is a Brazilian-born Italian female volleyball player.

She was part of the Italy women's national volleyball team. She competed with the national team at the 2000 Summer Olympics in Sydney, Australia, finishing 9th.

See also
 Italy at the 2000 Summer Olympics

References

External links
 
 
Ana Paula De Tassis at Sports Reference
http://www.cev.lu/Competition-Area/PlayerDetails.aspx?TeamID=2112&PlayerID=20286&ID=36
http://www.legavolleyfemminile.it/?p=5948
http://www.legavolleyfemminile.it/?page_id=194&idat=DET-ANA-65

1965 births
Living people
Italian women's volleyball players
Italian people of Brazilian descent
People from Governador Valadares
Volleyball players at the 2000 Summer Olympics
Olympic volleyball players of Italy